Don Juan Manuel (5 May 128213 June 1348) was a Spanish medieval writer, nephew of Alfonso X of Castile, son of Manuel of Castile and Beatrice of Savoy. He inherited from his father the great Lordship of Villena, receiving the titles of Lord, Duke and lastly Prince of Villena. He married three times, choosing his wives for political and economic convenience, and worked to match his children with partners associated with royalty.  Juan Manuel became one of the richest and most powerful men of his time, coining his own currency as the kings did.  During his life, he was criticised for choosing literature as his vocation, an activity thought inferior for a nobleman of such prestige.

Some confusion exists about his names and titles. Juan Manuel often refers to himself in his books as "Don Juan, son of infante don Manuel". But some 19th and early 20th century scholars started calling him infante, a title he did not possess, as in medieval Castile only the sons of kings were called infantes (and he was the grandson of Fernando III). The same applies for the title of Duke and Prince of Villena, that he received from Alfonso IV and Pedro IV of Aragón. While these titles follow the Aragonese nobiliary traditions, they were of little interest to the Castilian author, to the point that he never used them in his writings or correspondence, and they have only been associated to him by a handful of scholars.

Biography

Juan Manuel was born in the Castle of Escalona, in what is now the province of Toledo. He was a son of Manuel of Castile (son of Ferdinand III of Castile) and his second wife Beatrice of Savoy. His father died in 1284, and Juan was educated at the court of his cousin, Sancho IV, with whom his abilities made him a favourite. With the death of his mother in 1292, Juan Manuel became duke of Peñafiel. Juan Manuel was trained in arts such as equestrianism, hunting, and fencing, and in addition learned Latin, history, law, and theology.  At the age of twelve, he fought to repel the attack of the Moors from Granada to Murcia.

In 1304 he was entrusted by the queen mother, Doña María de Molina, to conduct political negotiations with James II of Aragon on behalf of her son, Ferdinand IV, then under age. The diplomacy was successful and Ferdinand's marriage to James II's daughter, Constantina, added to Juan Manuel's prestige.

Juan Manuel had constant confrontations with his king. At the time, the throne of Castile was occupied by two monarchs, Ferdinand IV and Alfonso XI.  Juan Manuel's loyalty was with Alfonso, to whom Juan Manuel gave the hand of his daughter Constanza. The wedding was postponed several times, until finally Alfonso XI jailed Constanza in the Castle of Toro for unclear reasons. This incident angered Juan Manuel, who decided to turn against Alfonso. He declared war on Alfonso, beginning a long confrontation.

On the death of his wife Constantina in 1327, Don Juan Manuel strengthened his position by marrying Doña Blanca de La Cerda y Lara; he secured the support of Juan Núñez, alférez of Castile, by arranging a marriage between him and ex-queen Constanza, to the infante of that kingdom, and he entered into alliance with Muhammed IV, Sultan of Granada. This formidable coalition compelled Alphonso XI to sue for terms, which he accepted in 1328 without any serious intention of complying with them; but he was compelled to release Doña Constanza. War speedily broke out anew, and lasted till 1331 when Alphonso invited Juan Manuel and Juan Nuñez to a banquet at Villahumbrales with the intention, it was believed, of assassinating them; the plot failed, and Don Juan Manuel joined forces with Peter IV of Aragon. He was besieged by Alphonso at Garci-Nuñez, whence he escaped on 30 July 1336, fled into exile, and kept the rebellion alive till 1338.

Finally, the Pope brought about reconciliation between Juan Manuel and Alfonso XI.  This reconciliation was not complete until 1340, when Juan Manuel and Alfonso allied against the Muslims in the Battle of Río Salado, taking the city of Algeciras. After these events, Juan Manuel left political life and retired to Murcia, where he spent his last years focused on literature. Proud of his works, he decided to compile them all in a single volume.  This compilation was destroyed in a fire, with no known copy preserved.

Juan Manuel died at Peñafiel in 1348, the age of sixty-six.

Works

Throughout his life, he wrote approximately thirteen books, of which only eight are preserved today. These works are predominantly didactic. Following the path of his uncle, Alfonso X of Castile, Juan Manuel wrote in Castilian, a peculiarity in times when Latin was the official language for educated writing.  He wrote in the vernacular to facilitate access to literature for a greater number of Castilian readers.

While his writings were directed largely to a literate class, it was nonetheless his assumption that they would be read aloud, as was common during the Middle Ages. He is ever conscious of propriety, and speaks carefully, both because of his elevated rank, and in case women or children should hear what he has written. His works reflect his character, ambitions, and beliefs, so that in many ways they are a mirror of his time and circumstances.

Juan Manuel's work is marked by a great preoccupation both with the practical and the spiritual life, and is directed not only to the nobility, but also to lower estates, since much of his work speaks not only of the duties of lords, but of their vassals as well. While his work is often classified under the general Medieval rubric of "the education of princes" it also begins to approach the Machiavellianism which is more characteristic of the Renaissance, by virtue of its dedication to the astute art of governing.

Chronological summary
Of Juan Manuel's surviving writings:
  was compiled between 1319 and 1325.
 The  was finished before the end of 1326.

El Conde Lucanor
The structure of stories reflects the ordinances and hierarchical structuring of the medieval world. In the first parts a young nobleman, Lucanor, proposes an abstract problem to Patronio; later, he gives an apologue which extracts the solution from Patronio's tale, applying it to himself. Juan Manuel concludes the story with a short verse, condensing the moral of the story into short, concrete statements.

It is essentially the production of a conscious artist, deliberative and selective in his methods. Don Juan Manuel naturalizes the Eastern apologue in Spain, and by the laconic picturesqueness of his expression imports a new quality into Spanish prose which attains its full development in the hands of Juan de Valdés and Cervantes.

Children

His first wife was Elizabeth, daughter of James II of Majorca. She died around 1301 and they had no children.

With Constance of Aragon, daughter of James II of Aragon:
 Constanza Manuel of Villena (1345), wife of prince Peter of Portugal.
 Beatrice Manuel of Villena, died young.
 Manuel of Villena, died young.

With Blanca de La Cerda y Lara:
 Fernando Manuel of Villena (died ), Lord of Escalona, Peñafiel and Villena, who married 1346 Joan, a daughter of Ramón Berenguer, Count of Ampurias, himself a younger son of James II of Aragon. The couple had a daughter, Blanca Manuel (1361), heiress of Villena, Escalona and Peñafiel until 1361.
 Juana Manuel of Villena (1339–1381), who married 1350 Henry II of Castile (1333–79) and became Queen of Castile.

Illegitimate with Inés de Castañeda:
 Sancho Manuel of Villena (1320–1347), 
 Enrique Manuel of Villena (1340–1390), count of Seia and lord of Sintra

Ancestors

See also
 Spanish literature

References

Sources
Ayerbe-Chaux, Reinaldo. Count Lucanor: Traditional matter and originality creadorá. Madrid: J. Porrúa Turanzas, 1975.
 Biglieri, Aníbal A. Towards a poetic one of the didactic story: Eight studies on count Lucanor. Chapel Hill: UNC Dept. of Romance Languages, 1989.
Flory, David. The Count Lucanor: Don Juan Manuel within his historical context. Madrid: Pliegos, 1995.
 Giménez Soler, Andrés. Don Juan Manuel. Biography and critical study. Zaragoza: F. Martinez, 1932.
Hammer, Michael Floyd. "Framing the Reader: Exemplarity and Ethics in the Manuscripts of the 'Count Lucanor'." Ph.D. University of California at Los Angeles, 2004.
Lida de Malkiel, Maria Rosa. "Three notes on Don Juan Manuel." Romance Philology 4,2-3 (1950): 155-94.
Wacks, David A. "Don Yllán and the Egyptian Sorcerer: Vernacular commonality and literary diversity in medieval Castile."  Sefarad 65,2 (2005): 413-33.
MacPherson, Ian. ed. Juan Manuel: A Selection. London: Tamesis Texts Limited, 1980.

External links
Infante Don Juan Manuel (Biografía)
Text of De lo que aconteció in Spanish
 

1282 births
1348 deaths
People from the Province of Toledo
Juan Manuel
14th-century Castilian nobility
14th-century writers
Juan Manuel
Castilian infantes
Spanish male writers